Michel Frank Kratochvil (born 7 April 1979) is a former tennis player from Switzerland. He was a member of the Swiss Davis Cup Team between 2000–2004 with a singles record 3–9, winning the decider in the first round of the 2003 World Group against Martin Verkerk of Netherlands 1–6, 7–6, 7–6, 6–1. He played doubles alongside Roger Federer in the 2002 Gstaad Open who was the defending champion but lost in the first round this time. He also defeated reigning champion Andre Agassi in the first round 2002 Indian Wells Masters.

ATP career finals

Singles: 2 (2 runner-ups)

ATP Challenger and ITF Futures finals

Singles: 10 (5–5)

Doubles: 4 (0–4)

Performance timeline

Singles

References

External links
 
 
 

1979 births
Living people
Sportspeople from Bern
Swiss people of Czech descent
Swiss male tennis players
People from Ostermundigen